An optical head-mounted display (OHMD) is a wearable device that has the capability of reflecting projected images as well as allowing the user to see through it. In some cases, this may qualify as augmented reality (AR) technology. OHMD technology has existed since 1997 in various forms, but despite a number of attempts from industry, has yet to have had major commercial success.

Types
Various techniques have existed for see-through HMDs. Most of these techniques can be summarized into two main families: "Curved Mirror" (or Curved Combiner) based and "Waveguide" or "Light-guide" based. The curved mirror technique has been used by Vuzix in their Star 1200 product, by Olympus, and by Laster Technologies. Various waveguide techniques have existed for some time. These techniques include diffraction optics, holographic optics, polarized optics, and reflective optics:
 Diffractive waveguide – slanted diffraction grating elements (nanometric 10E-9). Nokia technique now licensed to Vuzix.
 Holographic waveguide – 3 holographic optical elements (HOE) sandwiched together (RGB). Used by Sony and Konica Minolta.
 Polarized waveguide – 6 multilayer coated (25–35) polarized reflectors in glass sandwich. Developed by Lumus.
 Reflective waveguide – A thick light guide with single semi-reflective mirror is used by Epson in their Moverio product. A curved light guide with partial-reflective segmented mirror array to out-couple the light is used by tooz technologies GmbH.
 "Clear-Vu" reflective waveguide – thin monolithic molded plastic w/ surface reflectors and conventional coatings developed by Optinvent and used in their ORA product.
 Switchable waveguide – developed by SBG Labs.

Input devices
Head-mounted displays are not designed to be workstations, and traditional input devices such as keyboards do not support the concept of smart glasses. Input devices that lend themselves to mobility and/or hands-free use are good candidates, for example:
 Touchpad or buttons
 Compatible devices (e.g. smartphones or control unit)
 Speech recognition
 Gesture recognition
 Eye tracking
 Brain–computer interface

Recent developments

2012
 On 17 April 2012, Oakley's CEO Colin Baden stated that the company has been working on a way to project information directly onto lenses since 1997, and has 600 patents related to the technology, many of which apply to optical specifications.
 On 18 June 2012, Canon announced the MR (Mixed Reality) System which simultaneously merges virtual objects with the real world at full scale and in 3D. Unlike the Google Glass, the MR System is aimed for professional use with a price tag for the headset and accompanying system is $125,000, with $25,000 in expected annual maintenance.

2013
 At MWC 2013, the Japanese company Brilliant Service introduced the Viking OS, an operating system for HMD's which was written in Objective-C and relies on gesture control as a primary form of input. It includes a facial recognition system and was demonstrated on a revamp version of Vuzix STAR 1200XL glasses ($4,999) which combined a generic RGB camera and a PMD CamBoard nano depth camera.
 At Maker Faire 2013, the startup company Technical Illusions unveiled castAR augmented reality glasses which are well equipped for an AR experience: infrared LEDs on the surface detect the motion of an interactive infrared wand, and a set of coils at its base are used to detect RFID chip loaded objects placed on top of it; it uses dual projectors at a framerate of 120 Hz and a retroreflective screen providing a 3D image that can be seen from all directions by the user; a camera sitting on top of the prototype glasses is incorporated for position detection, thus the virtual image changes accordingly as a user walks around the CastAR surface.

2016
 The Latvian-based company NeckTec announced the smart necklace form-factor designed to facilitate AR glasses development due to transfer of processor and batteries in the necklace, thus making facial frame lite and elegant while augmenting the power and usage life of the AR device. The smart necklace serves as media player with almost unlimited storage and as Bluetooth headset for smartphone with cozy earphones storage, has patented key elements for AV glasses connection.

2018 

 Intel announces Vaunt, a set of smart glasses that are designed to appear like conventional glasses and are display-only, using retinal projection.  The project was later shut down.
 Zeiss and Deutsche Telekom partners up to form tooz technologies GmbH to develop optical elements for smart glass displays.

Market structure
Analytics company IHS has estimated that the shipments of smart glasses may rise from just 50,000 units in 2012 to as high as 6.6 million units in 2016. According to a survey of more than 4,600 U.S. adults conducted by Forrester Research, around 12 percent of respondents are willing to wear Google Glass or other similar device if it offers a service that piques their interest. Business Insider's BI Intelligence expects an annual sales of 21 million Google Glass units by 2018.

According to reliable reports, Samsung and Microsoft are expected to develop their own version of Google Glass within six months with a price range of $200 to $500. Samsung has reportedly bought lenses from Lumus, a company based in Israel. Another source says Microsoft is negotiating with Vuzix.

In 2006, Apple filed patent for its own HMD device.

In July 2013, APX Labs founder and CEO Brian Ballard stated that he knows of 25-30 hardware companies who are working on their own versions of smart glasses, some of which APX is working with.

Comparison of various OHMDs technologies

See also
 Epiphany Eyewear
 EyeTap
 Golden-i
 Open Cobalt
 Recon Instruments
 SixthSense
 Smartglasses
 Virtual retinal display

References

Further reading
 3D VIS Lab, University of Arizona – "Head-Mounted Display Systems" by Jannick Rolland and Hong Hua
 Optinvent – "Key Challenges to Affordable See Through Wearable Displays: The Missing Link for Mobile AR Mass Deployment" by Kayvan Mirza and Khaled Sarayeddine
 Comprehensive Review article – "Head-Worn Displays: A Review" by Ozan Cakmakci and Jannick Rolland
 Google Inc. – "A review of head-mounted displays (HMD) technologies and applications for consumer electronics" by Bernard Kress & Thad Starner (SPIE proc. # 8720, 31 May 2013)

Mixed reality
Multimodal interaction
Head-mounted displays
 Optical head
Emerging technologies
Wearable computers
Display devices